St Paul's Catholic College is a mixed-sex Roman Catholic secondary school and sixth form located in Burgess Hill, West Sussex, England.

History

The college first opened on 9 September 1963 as a modern secondary school serving the Mid-Sussex area. It was originally situated in the nearby town of Haywards Heath, but relocated to its current site at the northwestern edge of Burgess Hill in September 2004. St Pauls Catholic College in Burgess Hill took place in 2013–2014 to mark 50 years since the school opened.

In April 2013 the college was appointed as a National Teaching School and National Support School by the Department for Education.

The school had 1,850 students in 2014.

Previously a voluntary aided school administered by West Sussex County Council, in January 2022 St Paul's Catholic College converted to academy status. It is now sponsored by the Bosco Catholic Education Trust, and continues to be under the jurisdiction of the Roman Catholic Diocese of Arundel and Brighton.

Organization 
The college accepts children from the age of eleven through to eighteen. There are six houses: Athens, Corinth, Valletta, Damascus, Lystra and Rome.

The school has expanded the role of e-learning in the classroom, as well as being a fair-trade school, encouraging student support for both local and international good causes.

Accolades 
Results in GCSE and A-level and the college has been named consistently within the highest performing secondary schools nationally. There is a strong belief that education should be about developing the "whole person" by looking to develop student confidence, happiness, faith and academic success.

St Paul's was graded as 'outstanding' by Ofsted in 2007, 2008, and 2011. It was also graded as 'outstanding' in the Catholic School (Section 48) inspection by the diocese which evaluates the quality of Catholic education and the spiritual life of the school most recently in 2019.

References

External links

St Paul's Catholic College Website
St Paul's Catholic College Sixth Form Website
Bosco Catholic Education Trust
St Paul's VLE
Inspire Teaching School Alliance

Fair trade schools
Catholic secondary schools in the Diocese of Arundel and Brighton
Educational institutions established in 1963
1963 establishments in England
Burgess Hill
Secondary schools in West Sussex
Academies in West Sussex